PCSB may refer to:

Education
 The District of Columbia Public Charter School Board of the District of Columbia
 The Pinellas County School Board of Pinellas County Schools
 Postgraduate Certificate In Sustainable Business, a degree offered by the Cambridge Institute for Sustainability Leadership

Financial institutions
 PCSB Bank, a local bank in New York